Bangladesh–Canada relations are the foreign relations between Bangladesh and Canada established 1972. Canada is represented through its High Commission in Dhaka and Bangladesh is represented through its High Commission in Ottawa. They are members of the Commonwealth of Nations and the United Nations. Bangladesh currently receives ~$110 million from Canadian official development assistance per year as of January 2014. It is estimated that around 36,000 (2012) Bangladeshi people live in Canada, primarily in cities like Toronto, Vancouver, Montreal, Calgary, Edmonton, and Ottawa.

History 
Bangladesh and Canada have historically enjoyed friendly relations that have grown over the past fifty years. The political relations between the two countries date back to the time of the independence of Bangladesh. In 1971, the Canadian Government, people, and media expressed support and sympathy for Bangladesh's War of Independence. Canada was one of the first few countries to recognize Bangladesh after independence (14 February 1972). Eventually Bangladesh accredited its first High Commissioner to Canada in May 1972, and Canada reciprocated in September 1973. Since then there has been a steady development of relations between the two countries. The political relationship is, therefore, supportive and cooperative drawing upon shared links in the Commonwealth and various UN bodies.

Based upon shared values of democracy, freedom, human rights and rule of law, the bilateral relations are focused on trade and investment, regional security, development cooperation, immigration and people to people contact. As a major development partner of Bangladesh, since its independence in 1971, Canada's early development efforts involved reconstruction and rehabilitation, and then gradually moved into governance and rural development, especially in the field of agriculture, water management, primary education and health. Canada has always been appreciative of the firm commitment of Bangladesh to promote democracy and women empowerment. Canadian Government has also been engaged in socio-economic development in Bangladesh through various projects of Canadian International Development Agency (CIDA).

Country comparison

Trade and economic cooperation 

Comparative economic figures (2016)

Bangladesh's export-import business with Canada (2005-2015)

Canada - Bangladesh Bilateral Product trade (2011-2015)

Canada's Merchandise Trade with Bangladesh in 2017

Canada-Bangladesh Product Trade in 2015 

Commercial relationship between Canada and Bangladesh grew dramatically from 2003 to 2013. The value of bilateral merchandise trade more than tripled going from $478 million in 2003 to nearly $1.7 billion in 2012. During this period, Canadian merchandise exports to Bangladesh more than quadrupled and Bangladesh became the second largest source of Canadian merchandise imports from South Asia, after India. Canadian merchandise exports to Bangladesh were $525 million in 2012, down slightly from $552 million in 2011, while imports from Bangladesh were $1.1 billion in 2012, equal to 2011.

Canada's main exports to Bangladesh include cereals, vegetables, iron and steel, oilseeds, fertilizers, machinery and electronic equipment. Agri-food was the leading export sector from Canada to South Asia in 2012, making Bangladesh the second largest Canadian agri-food buyer in South Asia after India. The Canada-Bangladesh relationship is particularly important for the province of Saskatchewan. Saskatchewan's exports (mainly wheat, fertilizers and pulses) to Bangladesh have grown more than eightfold in the 2000s, from $49 million in 2003 to $412.5 million in 2015. In 2014 deal worth US$40 million was signed between Canadian Commercial Corporation and Bangladesh Agricultural Development Corporation for the potash export to Bangladesh. Saskatchewan Premier Brad Wall said "It provides Canpotex with new opportunities and access to a country that really needs our potash to boost its agricultural production and achieve its food security goals,"

Canada's main imports from Bangladesh include knit apparel, woven apparel, miscellaneous textile articles, headgear, fish and seafood, and footwear. Canada is a bright spot for Bangladeshi apparel, with garments and textile products making-up the bulk of Canada's merchandise imports from Bangladesh. Bangladesh has enjoyed duty-free market access since 2003. Potential trading opportunities to explore include expanding Canadian imports of ready-made garments, porcelain, jute and quality jute good, ceramic tableware and kitchenware. Garments and textile products accounted for approximate 96% of Canada's merchandise imports from Bangladesh in 2012.

Bangladesh mainly exports apparel products ($1.1 billion by 2012), frozen fish, plastic items, headwear, footwear, ceramic products, toys, games and sports equipment and furniture to Canada. In 2007, Bangladesh's exports to Canada were $506 million, which rose to $611 million in 2008, $706 million in 2009, $813 million in 2010, $1.078 billion in 2011, and $1.1 billion in 2014. Canada ranks as its sixth largest export destination. Thus, the issue of sustainability of exports to Canada in future years is an important one for Bangladesh.

Bangladesh imports mainly red lentils, cereals, edible oil, oil seeds, miscellaneous fruit items, fertilizer, mechanical appliances, wood pulp, paper/paperboard, scraps, and optical, medical, scientific and technical instruments from Canada. Bangladesh is the second largest importer of Canadian food grains and other agricultural products in South Asia. Moreover, potential areas of trade from Bangladesh to Canada are shipbuilding, pharmaceuticals, leather and leather goods and IT.

The volume of Bangladesh-Canada bilateral trade stood at US$2 billion in 2016 and aims to reach $5 billion by 2020. Canadian High Commissioner Laramée said the new Canadian Prime Minister Justin Trudeau wanted to work with Bangladesh, especially on environment and climate change issues. He also stated Canada's interest in working with Bangladesh on gender equality and in the health sector. There are also opportunities for Canadian companies to invest in the areas of food and agro processing, IT and telecommunications, renewable energy, engineering, automotive, shipbuilding, services and hospitality sectors.

Culture

In Canada, Bangladesh's culture and traditions are observed and practised by Bangladeshi immigrants and descendants of past generations of immigrants.

Education 

Hundreds of Bangladeshi students immigrate to Canada every year to attend Canadian universities and colleges.

Defense cooperation

Canada exported $90,018 worth of electronic equipment to Bangladeshi military. Military Training and Cooperation Program (MTCP) operates a number of training programs throughout the Asia-Pacific region, including Bangladesh.

References

External links
 High Commission of Canada in Bangladesh
 High Commission of Bangladesh in Canada
 Foreign Affairs, Trade and Development Canada

 
Bilateral relations of Canada
Canada